Poonchi, or Punchhi, may refer to:
 someone or something from Poonch, an area in Kashmir
 Poonchi dialect, spoken there
 Madan Mohan Punchhi (1933–2015), Chief Justice of India

See also 
 Poonch (disambiguation)
 Punch (disambiguation)
 Punshi